, is a 1993 Japanese science fiction anime television series. It consists of 51 episodes, and was directed by Gundam creator Yoshiyuki Tomino. The series was first broadcast on TV Asahi (and its ANN stations).  It is the fourth TV anime installment in the Gundam franchise, first series in the franchise released in Japan's Heisei period, and the final full series to be set in the Universal Century calendar.

Plot

Victory Gundam is set in UC 0153, and succeeds the Federation Force and Crossbone Vanguard conflict of Mobile Suit Gundam F91.  The Earth, still loosely controlled by the greatly weakened Earth Federation, comes under attack by BESPA, the armed forces of the space colony-based Zanscare Empire.  Only a ragtag resistance movement, League Militaire, stands in BESPA's way as they swiftly conquer much of space and start their invasion of Earth, with the advanced mass-produced mobile suit, the Victory Gundam, as the League Militaire's secret weapon. However, BESPA's power continues to grow, using violent means, including public executions with guillotines, to strike fear into those living on Earth.

Living peacefully on Earth in the remote Eastern European town of Kasarelia, 13-year-old Üso Ewin and his childhood friend Shahkti Kareen are soon thrown into the conflict when they encounter ace BESPA pilot Chronicle Asher. Soon, Üso finds himself joining forces with Marbet Fingerhut and the rest of the League Militaire, piloting the Victory Gundam against the BESPA, and soon discovering the horrors of war.

Production

Development

Victory Gundam is the fourth Gundam television series and the first of four Gundam television series that aired on TV Asahi and its sister ANN stations in Japan sequentially from 1993 through 1996.  In order to attract the younger elementary school age demographic that SD Gundam was popular with at the time, the show featured the youngest protagonist in the Gundam franchise, the thirteen-year-old Uso Ewin, and established a setting within Universal Century that was largely independent of previous Gundam works.  Unlike previous Gundam series that started off in space colonies, the show starts off in Eastern Europe before moving to space 15 episodes later.  The intent of this was for Tomino to dispel the association between Gundam and space. Nonetheless, the mature themes of the show, as well as the high casualty rate of the main cast, meant that the show would instead attract an older crowd, the young adults who had seen Mobile Suit Zeta Gundam and Mobile Suit Gundam ZZ a decade earlier.

The show was nonetheless able to more than double the sales of "real" Gundam models, which had been greatly lagging behind SD Gundam model sales. As SD Gundam model sales had been in a decline, Bandai's Gundam toy sales ultimately increased as a result of the show, but still missed its targets of 10 million units sold. Instead, Sunrise would go on to create Mobile Fighter G Gundam.

The Bandai acquisition of Sunrise was also in the planning stages during Victory Gundams development, with the former looking to address the declining popularity of the Gundam franchise, which was a main source of revenue for them.  Years later, Tomino would lament the fact that he had started production of this series not aware of that situation, which caused a rift between the director and Sunrise for many years.

Release
The entire series was released on DVD in Japan on January 23, 2004. The limited-edition DVD box release was notable for containing an interview of Tomino titled, .  Tomino has also made a similar comment on a Mobile Suit Zeta Gundam DVD interview.

Years after the show was first broadcast in Japan, the show aired on the anime satellite television network, Animax, in Japan and later its respective networks worldwide, including Hong Kong, Southeast Asia, East Asia, and other regions.

In 2015, Sunrise released Victory Gundam on Blu-Ray in two box sets using a new HD master and telecine. The sets also included audio commentary, exclusive booklets, and cover art by mechanical designer Hajime Katoki. As with the DVDs, Tomino reiterated his disdain for the series in promotional materials, claiming that he wished to "deny [the show] completely" and asked that viewers of the set "find what went wrong with 'Mobile Suit V Gundam'."

In 2016, Sunrise released the series on both Blu-ray and DVD in North America via Right Stuf Inc. in two sets.

Other media

Novelization
A series of five novels were written by director Yoshiyuki Tomino and initially published under the Kadokawa Sneaker Bunko label. This adaptation generally follows the plot of the anime but is notable for additional scenes and dialogue that contain graphic sexual references.  In addition, the Victory 2 Gundam does not appear in the novel. Instead it is replaced by a Victory-type with a mounted Minovsky Drive.  The "Bugs",  which were the automatic manslaughtering weapons of Gundam F91, also make an appearance.

Manga adaptations
A more lighthearted manga adaptation of the anime by Toshiya Iwamura was published on the Comic BomBom manga magazine.  The serious atmosphere from the show was absent from the manga, replaced by gags, less serious personalities, and more super robot-style action scenes.

A gag parody manga by Tsukasa Kotobuki entitled, 
was published throughout 1993 to 1994 in the Media Comic Dyne and MS Saga magazines, and was later republished in 2012 by Kadokawa Shoten, which included two side-stories from Gundam Ace involving Kai Shiden, and a parody story of Gundam Wing.

Spin-off manga
The manga occurs during the events of the anime, when Uso travels to Jupiter and encounters an old man by the name of Grey Stoke.

Video games
A Super Famicom side-scrolling action game based on the show was released in Japan on March 11, 1994. It was developed by Tose and published by Bandai. The series also made appearances in Banpresto's (now Bandai Namco) Super Robot Wars series, debuting in Super Robot Wars 2G for the Game Boy and recently, in the mobile game Super Robot Wars X-Ω and the Compati Hero Series as well as appearing in various Gundam crossover games.

References

External links

 
 

1993 anime television series debuts
1994 Japanese television series endings
1994 manga
1995 manga
Victory
Kadokawa Shoten manga
Shōnen manga
Sunrise (company)
TV Asahi original programming